The Fort Dona Maria II (Fortaleza de Dona Maria II in Portuguese) is located in Macau, in China.

History
Fort Dona Maria II was erected in 1852 to replace the one constructed by the Portuguese in the neighbouring hill of Mong-Ha, but both were maintained to cross their fires and better defend Macau from land attacks or seaborne attacks from the Cacilhas Bay, one of the few places in the east coast of Macau were landings were possible.

It bears an irregaular hexagon shape, moat and drawbridge and was built of stone and mortar, brick battlements and granite lintels probably under the supervision of engineer major António de Azevedo Cuna. Entrance is made via a tunnel which includes traditional shooting slits.

It was renovated in 1871 and 1872 but by 1899 the fort was deactivated.

It was bombed by American bombers during World War Two, on January 16, 1943, being unclear if the act was accidental or not.

See also
Portuguese Macau

References

Forts in Macau
Portuguese forts
Historic Centre of Macau
Urban public parks in Macau
Landmarks in Macau
Portuguese Macau
Chinese architectural history
1852 establishments in China
1852 establishments in the Portuguese Empire
19th-century establishments in Macau
Portuguese colonial architecture in China